Kimberley Sherri Knowles (born October 7, 1970) is an associate judge of the Superior Court of the District of Columbia. She served as a magistrate judge of the same court from 2010 to 2012.

Education and career 
Knowles earned her Bachelor of Arts from Cornell University in 1992, and her J.D. from Howard University School of Law in 1996. She is an alumni of Prep for Prep.

After law school, Knowles clerked for then Judge Eric T. Washington of the D.C. Superior Court. She then went on to work in the U.S. Attorney's Office in the District of Columbia. In 2004, she became the deputy chief of the office's Sex Offense/Domestic Violence Section.

D.C. superior court 
On May 10, 2010, Chief Judge Lee F. Satterfield appointed Knowles as a magistrate judge of the Superior Court of the District of Columbia.

President Barack Obama nominated Knowles on June 11, 2012, to a 15-year term as an associate judge of the Superior Court of the District of Columbia to the seat vacated by Zinora M. Mitchell. On July 20, 2012, the Senate Committee on Homeland Security and Governmental Affairs held a hearing on her nomination. On August 2, 2012, the Committee reported her nomination favorably to the senate floor and later that day, the full Senate confirmed her nomination by voice vote. She was sworn in on November 9, 2012.

Personal life 
Knowles was born and raised in Bronx, New York with 2 older brothers. She moved to Washington D.C. to attend law school and has remained there since. She is the adoptive parent of one child.

References 

1970 births
Living people
21st-century American judges
21st-century American women judges
African-American judges
Cornell University alumni
Howard University School of Law alumni
Judges of the Superior Court of the District of Columbia
People from the Bronx
21st-century African-American women
21st-century African-American people
20th-century African-American people
20th-century African-American women